INS Poshak is a self-propelled fuel carrier barge built by M/s Shalimar Works, Kolkata for the Indian Navy.

Description
It is an auxiliary ship capable to carry 500 tonnes of fuel. It has seagoing capabilities and have all essential communication and navigation equipment. The vessel is classed under IRS (No: 39518) with Class notation : +SUL, for carriage of oil with flash point above 60 Degree.

INS Poshak is named after a previous auxiliary vessel of same name which served the Indian Navy. It was delivered to the Indian Navy on 18 June 2012. Poshak is first of a series of two barges being built by the Shalimar Works (1980) Ltd.
M/s Shalimar Works secured the contract in November 2007 to manufacture two barges at a cost of INR 13.95 crores per barge.
The basic design, detail construction design and consultancy for test and trial was provided by M/s Marine Consultants, Selimpur Road Kolkata.

Specifications
Gross weight:	647 tonnes
Net weight: 195 tonnes
Dead weight: 650 tonnes
Displacement: 1100 tonnes
Overall length : 49.6 meters
Beam:	10.52 meters
Draught (max): 3.25 meters
Power: 2014 kW
Engine: Caterpillar
Auxiliary power: 2 x 122 kW 415 V 50 Hz AC
Speed : 14.5 Knots

See also

Hooghly class fuel barge

References

External links
INS Poshak at Shalimar Works 
Marine Consultants

Auxiliary ships of the Indian Navy